Christina Liu (born 7 April 1955) is a Taiwanese politician. She was first elected to the Legislative Yuan in 2001, and served until 2007. Subsequently, Liu led the Council for Economic Planning and Development from 2010 to 2012, when she was named finance minister. Liu left the finance ministry later that year and was appointed to the Hong Kong Economic Development Commission in 2013.

Education
Liu received a bachelor's degree in political science from the National Taiwan University and an MBA and doctorate in economics from the  University of Chicago.

Political career
Liu served in the Legislative Yuan from 2002 to 2007 as a member of the People First Party. She resigned her legislative seat in November 2007 to run for reelection as a member of the Non-Partisan Solidarity Union, and lost. Liu then became the chief economic adviser to Chinatrust Financial Holding until she was named the minister of the Council for Economic Planning and Development in 2010. Liu led the CEPD until 2012, when she was appointed the Minister of Finance. In April 2012, Liu pushed for a capital gains tax against the wishes of the Kuomintang legislative majority. She submitted her resignation on 29 May, and it was approved the next day. In 2013, Liu was appointed to the Hong Kong Economic Development Commission.

Personal life
Liu was married twice. She divorced Johnsee Lee in 1995. Her second marriage, to Simon Dzeng, ended in 2010 when both filed for divorce.

References

Living people
Taiwanese Ministers of Finance
1955 births
University of Chicago Booth School of Business alumni
Female finance ministers
Politicians of the Republic of China on Taiwan from Taipei
Members of the 5th Legislative Yuan
Members of the 6th Legislative Yuan
People First Party Members of the Legislative Yuan
Non-Partisan Solidarity Union politicians
Party List Members of the Legislative Yuan
National Taiwan University alumni